Americodema is a genus of plant bugs in the family Miridae. There are at least two described species in Americodema.

Species
These two species belong to the genus Americodema:
 Americodema knighti (Kerzhner & Schuh, 1998)
 Americodema nigrolineatum (Knight, 1923)

References

Further reading

External links

 

Phylini
Articles created by Qbugbot